John Corley may refer to:

John Thomas Corley, U.S. Army general
John D. W. Corley (born 1951), United States Air Force general